El Almendro (meaning "The Almond Tree") is a rural municipality in the Río San Juan department of Nicaragua.

Tradition states that El Almendro was founded in 1892, when Nery López, Perfecto Romero Acosta, Francisco González, and others, searchers of rubber trees and growers of Ipecacuanha (known locally as raicilleros) arrived looking for rubber and Ipecacuanha (known locally as raicilla).

Ipecacuanha played an important part in the town's history, and it was one of the largest exporters of rubber in the world. But later production fell. Near the end of the 1970s the inhabitants turned to farming, but today produce less than 10% of what they used to produce according to local resident José Benito Acevedo, 70.

In the 1970s, Julio Barrios, Federico Brenes, Ángela Acevedo, Raúl Rocha, Norma Mejía y Cándido Mejía, this last one having perished, travelled to the city of San Miguelito to get a survey done. Acevedo relates that it took them 4 years to get the town incorporated into a city.

In El Almendro's park they built a bust to the priest Lucinio Martínez, who founded la Asociación  para el Desarrollo de El Almendro (The El Almendro Development Society) or ASODEAL, by means of which progressive projects are brought to the city. Father Lucinio is well known in this town.

Municipalities of the Río San Juan Department